The 1892 Bury St Edmunds byelection was fought when the previous Conservative MP, Lord Francis Hervey resigned to become the Second Civil Service Commissioner. It was won by the unopposed Conservative candidate, Henry Cadogan.

References

Unopposed by-elections to the Parliament of the United Kingdom in English constituencies
Bury St
Bury St Edmunds by-election
Borough of St Edmundsbury
Bury St Edmunds
Bury